This is a list of the longest-running British comedy series in the United Kingdom, which have reached or exceeded 100 episodes.

List

See also
 List of longest-running United States television series
 List of longest-running Australian television series
 List of longest-running Indian television series
 List of longest-running Philippine television series
 List of longest-running Spanish television series
 List of television series canceled after one episode

References

Longest running
Longest running
Television series
British episode count